Asterionella formosa is a species of diatom belonging to the family Tabellariaceae.

It has cosmopolitan distribution.

References

Fragilariophyceae